The Museum of One Painting named after G. V. Myasnikov is a state museum, located in Penza, Russia.

It is a unique museum, which does not have analogies anywhere in the world. Its peculiarity is that it does not have a permanent exposition and that it only shows one painting.

Description 

The museum contains only one hall, which introduces only one painting that is usually of great cultural significance. Before visitors can familiarize themselves with the painting, they watch a 45-minute film, describing the peculiarities of the exhibit, its history and the biography of the painter. Such a presentation, starred by famous Russian actors such as Mikhail Ulyanov, Vyacheslav Tikhonov, Rostislav Plyatt, Oleg Yefremov, Oleg Tabakov, Ya. Smolenskiy, provide visitors with the opportunity to plunge into the atmosphere of the times, when the painting was created, to become utterly absorbed by the critical points of the painter's life and to get acquainted with the major milestones of his work.

History 

The museum was founded in 1983 on the initiative of Georg Vasilyevich Myasnikov, the second secretary of Penza regional committee of CPSU On 2 March 2002, the museum was named after him, and now on the front of the museum's building you can see a memorial tablet bearing his name.

The museum has existed for about 25 years. During this time it has been visited by more than 400,000 people. The museum has presented such masterpieces as "The Conquer of Snowy Town" by Vasily Surikov, "Major’s Matchmaking" by Pavel Fedotov, "The Father’s Greatcoat" by V. Popkov, "Spring" by Arkady Plastov, "Ship Grove" by Ivan Shishkin, "After the Battle" by Kuzma Petrov-Vodkin, "Portrait of a Young Woman" by Titian, "Abraham and the Three Angels" by Rembrandt, "The Magic Carpet" by Vasnetsov.

Interesting facts 

The museum building is considered to be an architectural monument of the 19th century.

References 

Art museums and galleries in Russia
Museum of One Painting named after G. V. Myasnikov
Art museums established in 1983
Museum of One Painting named after G. V. Myasnikov
Museums in Penza Oblast